Gabriella Verrasztó (born 25 October 1961) is a Hungarian former swimmer. She competed in two events at the 1976 Summer Olympics.

Gabriella is a 13 time Hungarian champion swimmer and is part of the national swimmers hall of fame in Hungary.

She started swimming at a young age alongside her brother Zoltán Verrasztó who became an Olympic medalist.

Her promising swimming career has come to an end when at the age of 18 she contracted brain-fever from a virus she came into contact with during a training camp in Spain. She has overcome the disease thanks to her exceptional strength and determination.

Gabriella studied at the University of Physical Education of Hungary and graduated in Sports Science and started a career as a swimming coach.

In 1984 she married Hungarian actor and theatre manager Zoltán Zubornyák. Their daughter Barbara was born in 1987.

In 1996 Gabriella got involved in Triathlon and became a successful coach and leader of the National Youth Programme for the sport for many years.

In recent years Gabriella has been coaching swimmers alongside her brother as well as becoming a Pentathlon coach.

Gabriella is also aunt of Evelyn Verrasztó and Dàvid Verrasztó.

References

1961 births
Living people
Hungarian female backstroke swimmers
Olympic swimmers of Hungary
Swimmers at the 1976 Summer Olympics
Swimmers from Budapest